Hypochalcia orbipunctella is a species of snout moth in the genus Hypochalcia. It was described by Ragonot in 1887. It is found in North Macedonia.

The wingspan is about 26 mm.

References

Moths described in 1887
Phycitini